Barney Morris (June 3, 1910 – May 24, 1962) was an American baseball player in the Negro leagues. A skillful pitcher, he played for the Monroe Monarchs, the Bismarck Churchills, the Pittsburgh Crawfords, and the New York Cubans. He died in New York in May 1962.

References

Sources

External links
 and Baseball-Reference Black Baseball and Mexican League stats and Seamheads

1910 births
1962 deaths
African-American baseball players
American expatriate baseball players in Mexico
Cincinnati Tigers (baseball) players
Industriales de Monterrey players
Kansas City Monarchs players
Mexican League baseball pitchers
Monroe Monarchs players
New Orleans Crescent Stars players
New York Cubans players
Newark Eagles players
Pittsburgh Crawfords players
Baseball players from Shreveport, Louisiana
20th-century African-American sportspeople
Baseball pitchers